Branton may refer to:

Branton, Northumberland, England
Branton, South Yorkshire, England
Branton (surname)

See also
Branton Files, documents espousing various conspiracy theories